Janzenella is a genus of wasp, the only member of the family Janzenellidae within the superfamily Platygastroidea. It contains only a single living species, Janzenella innupta, which has only been collected in Costa Rica. Fossil members of the living species have also been described from Miocene aged Dominican amber. A Late Eocene fossil species, Janzenella theia is known from specimens entombed in Baltic amber.

References 

Platygastroidea